De Franquetot is a surname. Notable people with the surname include:

 Robert Jean Antoine de Franquetot de Coigny (1652–1704), French army officer
 François de Franquetot de Coigny (1670–1759), Marshal of France
 François-Henri de Franquetot de Coigny (1737–1821), Marshal of France